Imera is a community in Servia municipality, Kozani regional unit, in the Greek region of Macedonia. It consists of the settlements Imera and Avra. The village Imera is situated at an altitude of 352 meters above sea level. The postal code is 50100, while the telephone code is +30 24640. At the 2011 census the population was 212.

References

Populated places in Kozani (regional unit)